Daryl Nelson (born 29 November 1934) is a former  Australian rules footballer who played with South Melbourne in the Victorian Football League (VFL).

Notes

External links 

Living people
1934 births
Australian rules footballers from Victoria (Australia)
Sydney Swans players